Joanne Ward (born 22 June 1975) is a British former tennis player. 

She competed in five Wimbledon Championships between 1994 and 2000, losing each time in the first round, and has represented the Great Britain Fed Cup team. She was for a time the British number two.

Career
Aged 16, Ward was told she would never play tennis again, after two knee operations. In 1994, she won the UK Tennis National Championships, beating British number one Clare Wood in the semifinals. In the same year, she made her debut at the Wimbledon Championships, losing in the first round to Dominique Monami. She also competed at Wimbledon in 1996, 1998 and 2000, losing first-round matches to Claire Taylor, Karen Cross and Anke Huber respectively. Ward also represented Great Britain in the Fed Cup and the European Championships.

Post-career
In 2004, Ward was one of a number of people who were highly critical of the Lawn Tennis Association, saying that it needed reform. She wanted more individual, tailored coaching.

ITF finals

Singles: 6 (3–3)

Doubles: 15 (9–6)

References

External links
 
 

1975 births
Living people
British female tennis players
Place of birth missing (living people)